UFC 8: David vs. Goliath was a mixed martial arts pay-per-view event held by the Ultimate Fighting Championship on February 16, 1996, at Ruben Rodriguez Coliseum in Bayamón, Puerto Rico. It is the only UFC event held in Puerto Rico and was later released on home video.

History
UFC 8 was the first UFC event located outside of the Continental United States. It featured an eight-man tournament, and a UFC Superfight Championship fight between reigning UFC champion Ken Shamrock and Kimo Leopoldo. The event also featured one alternate fight, which was not shown on the live pay-per-view broadcast. The tournament had no weight classes, or weight limits. A 10-minute time limit was imposed for all matches in the tournament except Superfight and final (15 minutes).

The event's matchups pitted larger fighters against smaller fighters, hence the term "David vs. Goliath".
Local promoter for the historical first and only professional mixed martial arts event was Richy Miranda-Cortese, whose company Sports & Entertainment Ltd had to take local Government officials to Federal Court in order to avoid cancellation of the event by the Government. Among those government officials was Governor Pedro Rosselló and Sports and Recreation Director Erick Labrador. The presentation of the event developed into a new boxing commission rules and regulations and Imposition of a banning Law that was later overturned after Miranda-Cortese fought it in court.

The tournament championship fight featured Don Frye against Gary Goodridge, with Frye taking the victory when Goodridge tapped out.

Just days before the show, the Puerto Rican government made a ruling banning the event. Two days before the card, Cablevision became the first major carrier, of what over the next few years would become nearly every major cable system in North America, to ban the show, stating it never expected to air UFC or similar type of programming ever again.
The event is also notable as being the first MMA event to draw criticism, including Michigan politician Calvin McCard’s on site protests at UFC 8. These protests would spark the nationwide movement against MMA in 1996, spearheaded by Arizona Senator John McCain, which would later temporarily push the sport in the United States underground in 1997.

Results

UFC 8 bracket

 Due to injury sustained in this fight, Varelans was unable to continue in the tournament and was replaced by Sam Adkins.

See also 
 Ultimate Fighting Championship
 List of UFC champions
 List of UFC events
 1996 in UFC

References

External links
UFC 8 Results from Sherdog.com
UFC 8 fights reviews
Official UFC website

Ultimate Fighting Championship events
1996 in mixed martial arts
Mixed martial arts in Puerto Rico
1996 in Puerto Rican sports